The discography of American jazz singer and pianist Shirley Horn includes seventeen studio albums, eight live albums, eight compilations, two video albums, four singles and five promotional singles.

Albums

Studio albums

Live albums

Compilation albums

Video albums

Other albums

Singles

Promotional singles

References

External links
 
 
 

Discographies of American artists
Jazz discographies
Blues discographies